Nicola Green (born 1972) is a British portrait painter, social historian, and public speaker. Her subjects have included the Dalai Lama, Barack Obama, and Diana, Princess of Wales.

In 2005, Green married David Lammy, a Labour Member of Parliament. They have three children.

Green has twice been among the exhibitors for the BP Portrait Award at the National Portrait Gallery in London, in 2006 and 2008.

Artwork and exhibitions

In Seven Days 
In 2010, Green created In Seven Days...  a set of seven silk-screen prints depicting Barack Obama's 2008 presidential election campaign. Green was inspired by her mixed-heritage children to record these events for the future. She gained access to Obama’s campaign, making six trips to events, such as his nomination at the 2008 Democratic National Convention in Denver and Inauguration in Washington D.C. In 2011 a set of In Seven Days...was donated to the Library of Congress; another set is in the Metropolitan Museum of Art. This series has also been exhibited at Harvard Law School,  Walker Art Gallery and Said Business School.

Encounters 
Encounters, a series of fifty portraits of religious leaders all with their faces and hands painted out, was shown at the church of St. Martin-in-the-Fields in Trafalgar Square in 2018. Among those represented were the Pope, the Dalai Lama, Ali Gomaa, Jonathan Sacks and Justin Welby. An accompanying book edited by Aaron Rosen, Encounters: The Art of Interfaith Dialogue, was published by Brepols.

Other work 
Green is a co-founder and trustee for Sophia Point, an education and conservation charity working in Guyana.

References

20th-century British painters
21st-century British painters
Alumni of the Edinburgh College of Art
British portrait painters
British women painters
Spouses of British politicians
1972 births
Living people
20th-century British women artists
21st-century British women artists